Waterlillies was a male-female electronica–pop–trip hop duo that released a pair of albums on Sire/Reprise/Warner Bros. Records in the 1990s. Group members are instrumentalist and producer Ray Carroll, with vocalist Jill Alikas-St. Thomas. Its first album was Envoluptuousity (1992). The group's biggest success came in 1994 when the title track of its second album, Tempted, hit number four on the Hot Dance Music/Club Play chart.

Propelled by a remix by Junior Vasquez, the song "Never Get Enough" went to number one on the US dance chart in 1995.

Discography

Albums
Envoluptuousity (1992)
Tempted (1994)

Singles
"Tired of You" (1992)
"Sunshine Like You" (1992)
"Tempted" (1994)
"Never Get Enough" (1994)

References

See also
List of number-one dance hits (United States)
List of artists who reached number one on the US Dance chart
Waterlilies - Lie With You

American electronic music groups
American dance music groups
Electronic music duos
Sire Records artists